Barbouria is a genus of shrimp in the family Barbouriidae, comprising two species.

B. cubensis
Barbouria cubensis was originally described in 1872 by Eduard von Martens – under the name Hippolyte cubensis – from anchialine caves between Cojimar and Castillo Morro, near Havana, Cuba. It has since been found in the Turks and Caicos Islands, Bermuda, Cayman Brac and the Bahamas. It is listed as a critically endangered species on the IUCN Red List.

B. yanezi
Barbouria yanezi was described in 2008 from Cozumel Island, Mexico.

References

Alpheoidea
Cave shrimp
Taxa named by Mary J. Rathbun
Taxonomy articles created by Polbot